The Hirsutospirellidae, established for the Late Triassic genus Hirsutospirella, are a family of Foraminifera within the Involutinida that produced calcareous tests with a proloculus followed by an undivided trochospirally enrolled tubular second chamber, in which the spiral side has prominent spinelike protrusions and umbilical side has a shallow umbilical filling.

References

Spirillinata
Foraminifera families
Prehistoric SAR supergroup families